Alto Paraná (Upper Paraná) is a department in Paraguay. The capital is Ciudad del Este (formerly known as Puerto Presidente Stroessner, originally Puerto Flor de Lis).

The Alto Paraná department has experienced tremendous economic and population growth in the past 50 years. Most of this growth has been concentrated in the department capital of Ciudad del Este, and mainly occurred after the construction of the Puente de la Amistad bridge in 1961, which connects Paraguay and Brazil. This department is home to the Itaipu power plant, which supplies 95% of the energy consumed by Paraguay, and the Acaray Dam. Several ecological reserves, a zoo and the Taiwanese-Paraguayan Technology Park are situated in this department.

The city of Presidente Franco was the first city founded in this department. Several important agricultural establishments are centered in the region of Minga Guazú which is home of the Guarani International Airport.

History 

In times of the colony, there were many establishments in this area. Many of them were very important, such as: Ontiveros, Ciudad Real, and Villa Rica del Espíritu Santo. Nevertheless, these villages did not prosper due to the constant attacks of the Bandeirantes.

Many populations settled on this area due to the promising forestall activity by the end of the 17th century and beginnings of the 18th century. These urban centers organized around military bases that serve to defend them against the attacks of the Bandeirantes. From about this time are some cities that exist until now, such as: Villa Curuguaty, Ygatimi, Caaguazú, Lima and Ajos.

After the War against the Triple Alliance, these lands were sold, creating large states in which the more important activities were the forestall exploit and the cultivation of yerba mate.

The department, as known today, was created in 1945.

By the end of the 19th century, it was a very active port known with the name of Tacurú Pucú, with means "high termite mound". This port was used for the transport of wood, through the Paraná River, to Encarnación, and from Encarnación to take food and clothes.

In 1990 was finally defined the department's structure.

Geography

Location 

This department is located in the Oriental Region of Paraguay, between parallels 24° 30′ and 26° 15′ of latitude south and between the meridians 54° 20′ and 55° 20′ of longitude west.

It is located in the Center East of Oriental Region. It border with:

 To the North: with Canindeyú Department
 To the South: with Itapúa Department
 To the East: with Brazil and Argentina
 To the West: with Caaguazú and Caazapá departments

The capital is Ciudad del Este, originally named Puerto Flor de Lis, and later Puerto Presidente Stroessner until it received the name that has nowadays once the dictatorial government of General Alfredo Stroessner was over. This city limits with the Brazilian city, Foz do Iguaçu.

Districts 

The department is divided in 22 districts:

* - The districts of Doctor Raúl Peña and Tavapy were created after the 2002 Census, therefore not displayed on the map.

Alto Paraná has a combination of valleys with streams that come from the Paraná River, it also has high lands and mountainous that can reach 300 meters above sea level.

The lands near the banks of the Paraná River have forests, which are in trouble nowadays because of the indiscriminate deforestation. In this places, are functioning programs of reforestation, with the special plantation of different species of pine.

Orography 

In the department there's practically no important elevations.

Hydrography 

The Paraná River is the most important supply of water for the department. The following are branches of this river:

 Itambey
 Ñacunday
 Limoy
 Itabo Guazú
 Pira Pyta
 Ycua Guazú
 Acaray
 Monday
 Yacuy

In this area, there are also several streams that help make the land fertile for the agriculture.

These streams and river outstand because the presence of the rocks of great size that give origin to beautiful waterfalls. Among these are the ones formed by the Monday and Ñacunday Rivers.

The powerful flow of the rivers Paraná and Acaray has been used in favor of constructing the hydroelectric power stations Itaipú and Acaray.

Climate 

The department receives abundant precipitation during the entire year, registered as  annually. This total is the highest anywhere in Paraguay. Consequently, this area has a lot of humidity in the environment, which is good for agriculture.

Fog and drizzle are constant in winter.

Economy 

The forestall exploit is the most important activity in the area. Nowadays, the population dedicates, in part, to the industrial process of different varieties of wood, such as: cedar, yvyra pyta, lapacho, taperyva guasu, petereby, guatambu, incense, guaica and others. Another important activity is the plantation of pine as a form of reforestation. There's also the exploit of palm hearts.

About 700.000 hectares are occupied in agriculture. Soy, maize, wheat, mint, cotton, sugarcane, tangerine, sweet orange, tomato, manioc, sweet potato, rice, potato, carrot, strawberry, sunflower, pea and ka’a he’e (a sweetener and medical plant) are cultivated.

In this department are breed cows and pigs, also cebú and nelore. The industry occupies a place of growing importance. There are factories of oil, food, sausages, sawmills, rice and yerba mills, of ceramic products, and also dairy products.

Education 

Alto Paraná has institutions that impart initial, elementary and secondary education. Also there are institutions working to impart education to the natives of the area. There are private universities and the national university.

Communication 

The most important ways of access to the department are Route No. 7 "Dr. Gaspar Rodríguez de Francia", that crosses the department from east to west and communicates with Asunción, and also the Route No. 6 "Juan León Mallorquín" that communicates with Encarnación and the south region of the country. There is a route that communicates with Salto del Guairá to the north.

An international bridge over the Paraná River connects Paraguay with Brazil.

The "Guaraní International Airport", in the Minga Guazú district, offers regular flights to Asunción, São Paulo, and connections with other flights.

The department has televisions stations. It has an automatic phone central and service of mobile phone communication. There are located many radio stations.

AM: Radio Parque, Itapiru, Magnificat, America, Concierto, La voz de Hernandarias, Cedro Ty, Corpus and Minga Guazú.

FM: Guarani, Progreso, Integración, Ciudad del Este, Virtual, Educacción, Yguazú, Naranjal, Transparaná, Pionera, Transcontinental, Santa Rita, Pentagrama and El Portal de Itapúa.

Tourism 

This department offers a very rich and attractive natural environment, specially represented by the Acaray and Paraná Rivers.

The following places are recommended to visit:

 Tati Yupi Refuge
 Itabó Natural Reserve
 Limoy Natural Reserve
 Ñacunday National Park
 Pikyry Refuge
 Carapá Refuge
 The mouth of Itambey River
 Minga Guazú Ecology Park
 Mbaracayú Refuge

Other touristic places are the modern engineering constructions that produce great admiration in the visitors, those are: the Amistad's Bridge, that communicates Paraguay and Brazil, the hydroelectric stations Itaipu Binacional and Acaray.

In Ciudad del Este there are the Park and Lake of the Republic, an artificial lake formed by the waters of the Amambay stream, the park serves as lung for the city. This space was created with the collaboration of every city council of the country.

Alto Paraná has several museums that exhibit artifacts of great scientific and cultural value, such as:

 The House of Culture in Ciudad del Este
 El Mensú Hydric Museum
 Museum of Natural History
 Itaipú Natural and Anthropology Museum

The Museum Moisés Bertoni was declared Natural and Scientific Monument. This place is a port, where Moisés Bertoni accomplished to compile a great variety of plants from the entire world and who dedicated his life to the preservation of the nature.

Sister provinces 

  Gyeonggi Province, South Korea

References

External links 

 Alto Paraná Info (in Spanish)

 
States and territories established in 1945